"Getting Along with the Government" is the seventh television play episode of the first season of the Australian anthology television series Australian Playhouse. "Getting Along with the Government" was written by Colin Free and directed by John Croyston and originally aired on ABC on 30 May 1966

Plot
A pleasant inefficient "boss", Mr Bigelow (Don Crosby), works at the Government Department for Marketing. He has a devoted secretary (Joan Lord) and an ambitious rival (Allan Trevor). he discovers that he is being visited by an inspector. But the inspector turns out to be an old schoolmate of the boss.

Cast
 Don Crosby as Mr Bigelow
 Allan Trevor
 Joan Lord
 Max Osbiston
 Liza Goddard

Reception
The Sydney Morning Herald called it a "rather banal sketch" which was "well put together and the dialogue often amusing" with "smooth performances".

The Age said it "emphasised the fact that it is not enough for a writer to have an idea. He must know and be able to employ necessary techniques that will be able him to carry it out. This was indeed a theme that required sparkling dialogue and an effective, if light, satiric touch. It missed out because these were just the things it lacked."

References

External links 
 
 

1966 television plays
1966 Australian television episodes
1960s Australian television plays
Australian Playhouse (season 1) episodes
Black-and-white television episodes